Brother Joe (Spanish: El Hermano José) is a 1941 Argentine comedy film.

Production

The 93-minute black and white film was made for Argentina Sono Film by director Antonio Momplet.
It was written by Nicolás Proserpio, and stars Pepe Arias, Carlos Castro and Ada Cornaro.

Synopsis

The movie deals with the interaction in a small town between a healer, his daughter and a young doctor, between science and superstition.

Reception

La Nación called the film a popular and satirical comedy. Halki noted that it was a visual version of a successful radio show.
Manrupe and Portela and said it was a classic Pepe Arias work, with everything good and bad that implies, and had been filmed without much effort.

Full cast
The full cast was:

 Pepe Arias
 Carlos Castro
 Ada Cornaro
 Dario Cossier
 María Duval
 Isabel Figlioli
 Ramón Garay
 Antonio Gianelli
 José Otal
 Raimundo Pastore
 Ernesto Raquén
 José Ruzzo
 Semillita
 Ernesto Villegas

References
Citations

Sources

External links

1941 films
1940s Spanish-language films
Argentine black-and-white films
Films directed by Antonio Momplet
Argentine comedy films
1941 comedy films
1940s Argentine films